Nikola Gligorov (born 15 August 1983) is a Macedonian football manager and former professional player who played as a defensive midfielder. He is the head coach of FK Vardar.

Club career
Gligorov started his career at Vardar Skopje but was loaned right away to FK Alumina, and later to FK Cementarnica 55 Skopje. At 2004–05 season he was regular at Vardar Skopje and stayed there until the winter-breal of the 2006–07 season. Then he moved to neighbouring Serbia where he joined Serbian SuperLiga side FK Bežanija playing there the second half of the 2006–07 season along his compatriots Mario Đurovski, Bojan Markoski, Perica Stančeski and Aleksandar Donev. They finished the season at 4th place, however, he left the Serbian club at the end of the season. He came back to the Macedonian championship, playing for Rabotnički Skopje, and from there he made a transfer to Vardar Skopje just to get back to Rabotnički Skopje the following season where he stayed till the end of the season 2010/2011. After that he played for a Cypriot club Alki Larnaca for two seasons, before signing for FK Khazar Lankaran on 28 May 2013. He made his debut in the first game of the season in a 1–1 draw against Sliema from Malta in Europa league qualification round.

International career
Gligorov made his senior debut for Macedonian national team on 11 August 2010 in an away friendly game against Malta that finished 1–1. He is yet to score his debut goal. He had previously represented the U-16, U-19 and U-21 teams since 1999. He has earned a total of 25 caps, scoring no goals and his final international was a March 2016 friendly match against Bulgaria.

Career statistics

Honours

Player

Club

Cementarnica 55
Macedonian Cup: 2002-03

Rabotnicki Skopje
Macedonian League: 2007-08
Macedonian Cup: 2007-08

Khazar Lankaran
Azerbaijan Supercup: 2013

Vardar Skopje 
Macedonian League: 2014–15, 2015-16, 2016–17
Macedonian Super Cup: 2015

References

External links
 
Player profile at MacedonianFootball 
 

1983 births
Living people
Footballers from Skopje
Association football midfielders
Macedonian footballers
North Macedonia youth international footballers
North Macedonia under-21 international footballers
North Macedonia international footballers
FK Cementarnica 55 players
FK Vardar players
FK Bežanija players
FK Rabotnički players
Alki Larnaca FC players
Khazar Lankaran FK players
Ethnikos Achna FC players
Macedonian First Football League players
Serbian SuperLiga players
Cypriot First Division players
Azerbaijan Premier League players
Cypriot Second Division players
Macedonian expatriate footballers
Expatriate footballers in Serbia
Macedonian expatriate sportspeople in Serbia
Expatriate footballers in Cyprus
Macedonian expatriate sportspeople in Cyprus
Expatriate footballers in Azerbaijan
Macedonian expatriate sportspeople in Azerbaijan